Si Pey (also Romanized as Sī Pey) is a village in Kaseliyan Rural District, in the Central District of Savadkuh County, Mazandaran Province, Iran. At the 2006 census, its population was 295, in 67 families.

References 

Populated places in Savadkuh County